The 2013/14 FIS Freestyle Skiing World Cup was the thirty fifth World Cup season in freestyle skiing organised by International Ski Federation. The season started on 17 August 2013 and ended on 23 March 2014. This season included five disciplines: moguls, aerials, ski cross, halfpipe and slopestyle.

Men

Ski cross

Moguls

Aerials

Slopestyle

Halfpipe

Ladies

Ski Cross

Moguls

Aerials

Slopestyle

Halfpipe

Men's standings

Overall 

Standings after 36 races.

Moguls 

Standings after 11 races.

Aerials 

Standings after 5 races.

Ski Cross 

Standings after 11 races.

Halfpipe 

Standings after 4 races.

Slopestyle 

Standings after 5 races.

Ladies' standings

Overall 

Standings after 36 races.

Moguls 

Standings after 11 races.

Aerials 

Standings after 5 races.

Ski Cross 

Standings after 11 races.

Halfpipe 

Standings after 4 races.

Slopestyle 

Standings after 5 races.

Nations Cup

Overall 

Standings after 72 races.

Men 

Standings after 36 races.

Ladies 

Standings after 36 races.

Footnotes

References

FIS Freestyle Skiing World Cup
World Cup
World Cup